The 2019 F3 Asian Championship was a multi-event, Formula 3 open-wheel single seater motor racing championship held across Asia. The championship featured a mix of professional and amateur drivers, competing in Formula 3 cars that conform to the FIA Formula 3 regulations for the championship. It was the second season of the championship.

The season commenced on 6 April at Sepang International Circuit and concluded on 29 September at Shanghai International Circuit, after fifteen races held at five meetings.

In 2019 the F3 Asian Championship hosted a Winter Series to give existing and new drivers from around the world an opportunity to prepare for the new season.  The inaugural season of the Winter Series consisted of three rounds with nine total races, beginning on 11 January at Chang International Circuit and ending on 24 February after two more rounds at Sepang International Circuit.

Summer Series

Teams and drivers

Race calendar
The second season of the series will be contested in four countries.

Championship standings

Scoring system
Points are awarded to the top ten drivers.

Drivers' Championship

Notes:
† — Drivers did not finish the race, but were classified as they completed over 75% of the race distance.

Masters Cup

Teams Championship

Notes:
† — Drivers did not finish the race, but were classified as they completed over 75% of the race distance.

Winter series

Teams and drivers

Race calendar

Championship standings

Scoring system
Points are awarded to the top ten drivers.

Drivers' Championship

Masters Cup

Teams Championship

Notes:
† — Drivers did not finish the race, but were classified as they completed over 75% of the race distance.

Footnotes

References

External links
 

Asian F3
F3 Asian Championship
Asian F3